Al AbdulKarim Tower (Arabic: برج العبدالكريم) is a skyscraper in Khobar, Saudi Arabia.

Skyscrapers in Saudi Arabia